Phaius borneensis is a species of orchid in the genus Phaius. It is native to the Islands of Borneo, Palawan and Mindoro.

References

borneensis
Plants described in 1903
Orchids of Borneo
Orchids of the Philippines